Radio Today is a 24 hours radio station in Bangladesh that started airing in May 2006. It is currently available in Dhaka, Chittagong, Cox's Bazar, Khulna, Bogra, Sylhet, Mymensingh, Barishal, Kushtia, Comilla.

Information
It started as the country's first private FM radio station in May 2006, in Dhaka at 89.6 MHz. It later became available in Chittagong & Sylhet. Now it coverage in Dhaka, Chittagong, Cox's Bazar, Khulna, Bogra and Sylhet.

Programs
Radio Today plays popular Bangladeshi music. Music is featured in programs such as Today's Classic, Morning Crush, School of Rock, Afternoon Cafe, Minner Live, OMG, FM Mama, Movie Madness, HOT FM, Radio Gaan Buzz, The Mastermind Show by Kazi Nipu. The Salman show by Salman Mohammad Abdullah.

News
Everyday News, airs five times a day giving news updates with Dhakar Chaka giving live traffic updates in between other shows. Morning News, Evening News and other news are also podcast on website on a daily basis.

References

External links
 
 

Radio stations in Bangladesh